Little Bookham is a small, historic village in Surrey, England between Great Bookham and Effingham. It is home to several listed historical buildings, included in a large conservation area, along with Ye Olde Windsor Castle public house, Manor House School, and All Saints' Church.  The village is centred immediately north of the North Downs and is contiguous with Great Bookham, the two divisions of Bookham having been made in the early medieval period.

History 

It is difficult to conjecture when the parish of Little Bookham was formed. The first documentary evidence can be found after the conversion of England to Christianity in the 7th century. The Venerable Bede states that Erconwald, who became Bishop of London in 674, founded the Benedictine Abbey of St. Peter of Chertsey in 666, and Frithuwald, who was sub-king or regent of Surrey, joined in the grant endowing the abbey with certain lands.

Frithuwald, however, seems to have been the subject at that time of Ecgberht, King of Kent, and the charter is stated to have been confirmed by Wulfhere, King of Mercia, to whom the overlordship of Surrey must have been passed before his death in 675. It has been stated that the monastery was first built under King Egbert.

According to a charter C.675, the original of which is lost but which exists in a later form, there was granted to the Abbey twenty dwellings at Bocham cum Effingham. This was confirmed by four Saxon kings; Offa, "King of the Mercians and of the nations roundabout" in 787; Æthelstan who was "King and ruler of the whole island of Britain" in 933 confirmed the privileges to the monastery; King Edgar, "Emperor of all Britain" in 967 confirmed "twelve mansiones" in Bocham, and King Edward the Confessor, "King of the English" in 1062 confirmed twenty mansae at Bocham cum Effingham, Driteham and Pechingeorde. Driteham and Pechingeorde are both referred to in the Domesday Book and appear to have been absorbed into the manors of Effingham and Effingham East Court.

Little Bookham lay within the Anglo-Saxon administrative district of Effingham half hundred.

Little Bookham appears in the Domesday Book of 1086 as Bocheham. It was held by Halsard from William de Braiose. Its Domesday Assets were: 2 hides; 2 ploughs,  of meadow, herbage and pannage worth 11 hogs. It rendered (in total): £3.

Parts of the present parish of Effingham, however, lying to the east of Effingham Common Road at one time belonged to the parish of Little Bookham. The charters of Frithwald, Offa, Edgar and Edward the Confessor are all believed to be substantially fabricated, but probably embodied authentic material or recorded an earlier genuine transaction. These charters were probably written at a later date than stated in order to confirm a position which was thought to have existed at that earlier date. The Charter of Æthelstan is believed to be complete fabrication.

It seems probable, as the number of cottages in Bocham cum Effingham remained constant, that the later charters must have been copies of earlier charters which were not revised to accord with the actual number of cottages at any one time.

The Old Rectory

The King and Queen of Yugoslavia were evacuated to the Old Rectory in Little Bookham during the Second World War, now partly redeveloped into six houses.

Domesday Book record 

The Domesday Book of 1086, which was a survey for taxation purposes, makes the first known distinction between the parishes of Great and Little Bookham, if it is assumed that there was no separate parish at the time of the charter of Edward the Confessor in 1062. As the Domesday Book makes no reference to there being a church in Little Bookham, then the church must have been built sometime subsequent to that date and that the parish of Little Bookham is likely a slice cut from the parish of Bookham. By way of confirmation of this supposition that there is no distinction between the two parishes, as recently as 1824, lay documents relate to land transactions, in which land was described as being "in Great Bookham in the parish of Bookham".

The Domesday survey refers to the manor of Little Bookham being held by Halsard of William de Braose, Lord of Bramber, and the manor appears to have remained in the Halsard or Hansard family until about 1291. It would seem, therefore, that Little Bookham Parish Church was built by the Hansard family about 1100 and probably at first was a manorial chapel. It is dedicated to All Saints and is a Grade II* listed building.

Roads in Little Bookham 
Lower Road, Water Lane, Manor House Lane, Guildford Road, Woodlands Road, Links Way, Chalkpit Lane, Rectory Lane, Little Bookham Street, Long Meadow, Bennetts Farm Place, Heatherside Close, Fox Lane, Longheath Drive, Burnhams Road, Edgeley, Atwood, Maddox Park, Maddox Lane, Little Acre.

Petition to create Little Bookham postal locality

Royal Mail do not recognise prefixes 'Great' or 'Little' in its published data cross referencing the optional locality line(s) with numerical subdistricts (inward codes) of postcodes, meaning that residents' addresses are incomplete when the information is computer-generated or looked up using postcodes alone.

Royal Mail are willing to update their records to add the specific localities to its data if Mole Valley D.C. and MP, Paul Beresford, need to give permission for this.

The Council have asked residents to sign a petition to show that they support this update, before they decide whether to give their permission. The petition reached sufficient initial support to be hosted at the local authority website. The problem can be overcome manually by broader postcode to traditional/main locality search boxes online.

As of April 2020, Royal  Mail now recognises both Little Bookham and Great Bookham as separate localities by their postcodes.

Images

See also
 Bookham Commons
 Great Bookham
 Manor House School, Little Bookham

References

External links

Villages in Surrey
Mole Valley